This article contains information about the literary events and publications of 1683.

Events
May 17 – Jordaan Luchtmans, the predecessor of Brill Publishers, is registered as a bookseller by the Leiden booksellers' guild.
May 25 – Lancelot Addison is appointed Dean of Lichfield.
June 26 – Madame de La Fayette is widowed.
August/September – John Locke flees to the Netherlands, under suspicion of involvement in the Rye House Plot in England.
November 4 – Marriage of André Dacier and Anne Lefèvre in Paris.
December 7 – English parliamentarian Algernon Sidney is executed for treason, based largely on the anti-monarchist views expressed in his Discourses Concerning Government.
unknown dates
John Banks' historical play The Innocent Usurper, about Lady Jane Grey, is banned from the stage by the censors.
A public library is first recorded at Kirkwall on Orkney.

New books

Fiction
Alexander Oldys (?) – The London Jilt; or, the Politick Whore
"Abbé du Prat" (pseudonym) – Venus in the Cloister; or, The Nun in her Smock (Vénus dans le cloître, ou la Religieuse en chemise)

Drama
Joshua Barnes – Landgartha, or the Amazon Queen of Denmark and Norway
Chikamatsu Monzaemon – Yotsugi Soga (The Soga Successors/The Soga Heir)
John Crowne – City Politiques
John Dryden and Nathaniel Lee – The Duke of Guise
Sor Juana – Los empeños de una casa (The Trials of a Noble House)
Nathaniel Lee – Constantine the Great
Thomas Otway – The Atheist
Edward Ravenscroft – Dame Dobson
Sor Juana Inés de la Cruz – Los empeños de una casa
Pedro Calderon de la Barca – El pintor de su deshonra

Poetry
Robert Gould – Love Given O'er: Or a Satyr on the Inconstancy of Woman

Non-fiction
"R. B." (i. e. Nathaniel Crouch), compiled – Two Journeys to Jerusalem
John Dryden – Plutarch (one of the first biographies in the English language)
Joseph Moxon – Mechanick Exercises
John Pordage – Theologia Mystica
Dr. Thomas Sydenham –

Births
April 3 – Mark Catesby, English naturalist (died 1749)
December 27 – Conyers Middleton, English controversialist and cleric (died 1750)

Deaths
January 15 – Philip Warwick, English writer and politician (born 1609)
March 19 – Thomas Killigrew, English dramatist and manager (born 1612)
August – Ralph Josselin, English diarist and Anglican cleric (born 1616)
August 24 – John Owen, English theologian (born 1616)
October 20 – Marie-Catherine de Villedieu, French novelist and dramatist (born 1640)
November 18 – Innokentiy Gizel, Ukrainian historian (born c. 1600)
December 15 – Izaak Walton, English writer and biographer (born 1593)

References

 
Years of the 17th century in literature